CodePeer is a static analysis tool, which identifies constructs that are likely to lead to run-time errors such as buffer overflows, and it flags legal but suspect code, typical of logic errors  in Ada programs. All Ada run-time checks are exhaustively verified by CodePeer, using a variant of abstract interpretation.  In October 2014, CodePeer was qualified for use in safety-critical contexts  as a sound tool for identifying possible run-time errors. CodePeer also produces detailed as-built documentation of each subprogram, including pre- and post-conditions, to help with code review and to ease locating potential bugs and vulnerabilities early.

CodePeer is produced by AdaCore, a computer software company with North American headquarters in New York City and European headquarters in Paris.

See also
Abstract interpretation
Static code analysis
Software testing
Software Security Assurance
List of tools for static code analysis

References

External links
 CodePeer product description
 AdaCore web site
 CodePeer qualification news release
 AdaCore's CodePeer developed in partnership with SofCheck
 Why is static analysis a challenge? - interview with Michael Friess
 Tucker Taft, "Advanced static analysis meets contract-based programming", 2013.
 Embedded Computing Design, "Making static analysis a part of code review", 2009.

Static program analysis tools
Java platform software
Development software companies